A doula is an assistant providing non-medical support during and after childbirth.

Doula may also refer to:

 Doula (anatomy) or dulla, a sac that is inflated when the male dromedary is in rut

People
 Doula Mouriki (1934–1991), Greek Byzantinist and art historian
 Siraj ud-Daulah, an eighteenth-century ruler of Bengal, often spelled Siraj-ud-Doula in older literature
 Sayf al-Dawla, a medieval ruler of Aleppo, frequently spelled Saif al Doula

See also
 Douala, a city in Cameroon
 Doulos (disambiguation), the masculine form